William Blumberg (born January 26, 1998) is an American professional tennis player. A former college player at the University of North Carolina at Chapel Hill, Blumberg has a career-high doubles ranking of world No. 74 achieved on September 12, 2022. He reached a career-high of World No. 438 in singles on February 18, 2019.

Early life, Junior and College career
William's parents are Amy and David Blumberg. Blumberg identifies as Catholic, like his mother, while his father is Jewish. The family often has Jewish food during holidays. 

Blumberg has two brothers. He attended Greenwich High School in Greenwich, Connecticut. As a senior at Greenwich, he went undefeated and did not lose a set all season.

During his junior career, he played at each of the four grand slam junior tournaments. He reached the final in the boys' doubles at the 2015 French Open partnering fellow American Tommy Paul.

Blumberg was the nation's top recruit for the class of 2016. After going 26–2 during his first season at North Carolina, Blumberg was named ACC Freshman of the Year, first-team all-ACC, and ITA Men's Tennis Rookie of the Year. He was also named the Most Outstanding Player at the 2017 NCAA tournament. In May 2021, he became the first 10-time All-America in ITA history, winning the honor in both singles and doubles in 2017, 2018, 2019, 2020 and 2021.

Professional career

2017-2019: Grand Slam doubles debut, Top 500 debut in singles
Blumberg made his Grand Slam main draw debut at the 2017 US Open after receiving a wildcard for the doubles main draw with compatriot Spencer Papa.

He reached a career-high of World No. 438 in singles on February 18, 2019.

2021: Turned Pro, Maiden ATP title, Challenger tour success, Top 200
He partnered as a wildcard pair with Jack Sock at the 2021 Hall of Fame Open in Newport, where he won his first ATP match. The unseeded pair reached the finals by defeating fellow Americans Tennys Sandgren and Denis Kudla, third seeds John-Patrick Smith and Harri Heliövaara, and second seeds Jonathan Erlich and Santiago González. In the final they defeated Austin Krajicek and Vasek Pospisil. With this run he entered the top 300 at World No. 284 on July 19, 2021, rising more than 1000 spots in the doubles rankings.

He made his debut in the top 200 on November 1, 2021 after winning his first and second Challengers in Cary in September and Las Vegas in October with Max Schnur. He followed that with a third Challenger win in Charlottesville in November also with Schnur.

2022: Major debut & win, Two titles, Top 100, US Open Mixed doubles semifinal
In January, Blumberg won his fourth Challenger title in Cleveland with Schnur.

At the 2022 U.S. Men's Clay Court Championships, he reached the semifinals as a wildcard pair with Schnur where they lost to Ivan and Matej Sabanov.

At the 2022 Wimbledon Championships he made his debut at this Major partnering Casper Ruud. They defeated Miguel Angel Reyes-Varela and Nicolas Barrientos in the first round in a five set match with a super tiebreak, his first win at a Major. They lost in the second round to Lloyd Glasspool and Harri Heliovaara.

At the 2022 Hall of Fame Open, he made his ATP main draw singles debut as a qualifier, losing in the first round to Benjamin Bonzi. At the same tournament as the defending champion in doubles, he reached the final partnering Steve Johnson. He would successfully defend his title with Johnson, defeating top seeds Raven Klaasen and Marcelo Melo in the final.

He reached the top 100 at World No. 85 on August 8, 2022 following his third title at the 2022 Los Cabos Open partnering Miomir Kecmanović, again defeating Klaasen and Melo in the final.

At the US Open he reached the mixed doubles semifinals with Caty McNally on his debut at this event for the first time at a Grand Slam defeating en route defending champions Desirae Krawczyk and Neal Skupski in the second round.

He finished the season ranked No. 100 in doubles on 21 November 2022.

ATP career finals

Doubles: 3 (3 titles)

Junior Grand Slam finals

Doubles: 1 (1 runner-up)

ATP Challenger and ITF Futures finals

Doubles: 5 (4–1)

References

External links

 
 
 North Carolina Tar Heels bio

1998 births
Living people
American male tennis players
Sportspeople from New York City
Sportspeople from Greenwich, Connecticut
North Carolina Tar Heels men's tennis players
Tennis people from Connecticut
Jewish tennis players
Jewish American sportspeople
Greenwich High School alumni
21st-century American Jews